Sidi Ramadan Mosque is a historic mosque in the city of Algiers. The mosque is located in the Casbah of Algiers. It has an area size of 400 square meters and the minaret reaches 32 meters high. The mosque is a part of the UNESCO World Heritage Site Casbah of Algiers.

Etymology
The mosque is named after Sidi Ramadan, one of the soldiers who participated in the Early Muslim conquests of North Africa, led by Uqba ibn Nafi. After the conquest of Algiers, Ramadan was assigned by Uqba as a chief of the city. He was buried in the pillar of the mosque after his death. Another account of the naming origin tells that Sidi Ramadan was a generous wali of the city of Biskra. Sheikh Abdurrahman al-Gilani tells in his work that the actual name of the mosque was Al-Qaid Ramadan Mosque, and mentions the name of Ibn al-Mufta who contributed greatly to the foundation.

History
The date of the mosque's foundation is not known exactly, but it is known that it at least predates the Ottoman period of the city. Georges Marçais, a 20th-century French archeologist, suggested that its foundation could be roughly contemporary with the late 11th-century Great Mosque of Algiers, founded by the Almoravids. Algerian newspaper al-Hiwar, after interviewing local experts and staff at the mosque, reported that current available information dates its foundation to the 10th or 11th century. The mosque is located at the upper part of the city, and constituted the old border of the Casbah (citadel or kasbah) when the city was controlled by Amazigh rulers.

The mosque was designated as the National Heritage of Algeria in 1904. It was also inscribed in the UNESCO World Heritage Site List as a part of the Casbah of Algiers in 1992.

Architecture 

The mosque has a relatively simple form, with a hypostyle prayer hall divided by rows of arches supported by columns. Along three outer edges of the hall are elevated galleries or balconies that serve as the women's section for prayers. The mosque's attached minaret has sebka decoration carved across its façades. The remains of Sidi Ramadan are housed in a small independent mausoleum next to the mosque.

Notable Imams
 Mohamed Charef (1908-2011)

See also
 Algerian Islamic reference
 Hizb Rateb (Hezzab, Bash Hezzab, Salka)
 Lists of mosques
 List of mosques in Africa
 List of mosques in Algeria

References

External Links 

 Images of Sidi Ramdane Mosque in Manar al-Athar digital heritage archive

11th-century mosques
Casbah of Algiers
Mosques in Algiers